Ekmania is a genus of flowering plants in the daisy family. It contains only one known species, Ekmania lepidota, endemic to Cuba.

The genus is named in  honor of botanist Erik L. Ekman of Harvard University.

References

Flora of Cuba
Vernonieae
Monotypic Asteraceae genera